T.K. Shutter Reserve is a sporting venue located in Adelaide, Australia. It is mainly used for association football and is the home ground for North Eastern MetroStars. There is a club house located in the reserve, but no stadium facilities.

References

Soccer venues in South Australia